Dan Mathunjawa (born 1 June 1970) is a Swazi boxer. He competed in the men's middleweight event at the 1996 Summer Olympics.

References

1970 births
Living people
Swazi male boxers
Olympic boxers of Eswatini
Boxers at the 1996 Summer Olympics
Commonwealth Games competitors for Eswatini
Boxers at the 1994 Commonwealth Games
Place of birth missing (living people)
Middleweight boxers